Leptosiphon serrulatus (syn. Linanthus serrulatus) is a rare species of flowering plant in the phlox family known by the common name Madera linanthus. It is endemic to California, where it is known from the chaparral and woodlands in the Sierra Nevada foothills, from Madera to Kern Counties.

Description
Leptosiphon serrulatus is a plant of woodlands, chaparral, and yellow pine forests. It is a small annual herb producing a thin, hairy stem up to about 18 centimeters tall. The leaves are divided into linear lobes up to a centimeter in length. The inflorescence is a head of small flowers, each with a purplish tube almost a centimeter long and a white corolla.

External links
 Calflora Database: Leptosiphon serrulatus (Madera leptosiphon)
Jepson Manual eFlora (TJM2) treatment of Leptosiphon serrulatus
UC CalPhotos gallery: Leptosiphon serrulatus

serrulatus
Endemic flora of California
Flora of the Sierra Nevada (United States)
Natural history of the California chaparral and woodlands
Natural history of Fresno County, California
Natural history of Kern County, California
Natural history of Madera County, California
Natural history of Tulare County, California
Critically endangered flora of California